Catasetum naso, the nose catasetum, is a species of orchid found from Colombia to Venezuela.

References

External links

naso
Orchids of Colombia
Orchids of Venezuela
Plants described in 1843